Betanzos Canton is one of the cantons of the Betanzos Municipality, in the Cornelio Saavedra Province, in the Potosí Department in south-west Bolivia. During the census of 2001, it had 7,362 inhabitants.  Its seat is Betanzos, which is also the capital of the Betanzos Municipality and Cornelio Saavedra Province.

References 

Cantons of Potosí Department
Cantons of Bolivia